Erich Otto Friedrich Herker (25 September 1905 in Belleben – 2 September 1990 in Berlin) was a German ice hockey player who competed in the 1932 Winter Olympics.

In 1932 he was a member of the German ice hockey team, which won the bronze medal. He played two matches and scored one goal.

External links
profile

1905 births
1990 deaths
Olympic ice hockey players of Germany
Ice hockey players at the 1932 Winter Olympics
Olympic bronze medalists for Germany
Olympic medalists in ice hockey
Medalists at the 1932 Winter Olympics
People from Salzlandkreis
Sportspeople from Saxony-Anhalt